Macquarie Group Limited is an Australian global financial services group. Headquartered and listed in Australia, Macquarie employs more than 17,000 staff in 33 markets, is the world's largest infrastructure asset manager and Australia's top ranked mergers and acquisitions adviser, with more than A$737 billion in assets under management.

History

1969–1979 
Macquarie was founded on 10 December 1969 as Hill Samuel Australia Limited, a subsidiary of the UK's Hill Samuel & Co. Limited.

Australian businessman Stan Owens compiled a proposal for Hill Samuel & Co. to establish an Australian subsidiary. After presenting his report in London, Mr Owens was offered the role of implementing it. He became Executive Chairman of Hill Samuel Australia (HSA) and founded the company from offices at Gold Fields House in Sydney's Circular Quay. The company's first three employees were Stan Owens, Blair Hesketh and Geoff Hobson. Later Chris Castleman (on loan from the British parent) and Bill Clarke joined. David Clarke and Mark Johnson were introduced to HSA and became joint managing directors in 1971. Despite being given a four-year allowance by the British parent to turn a profit, HSA was profitable by the end of its first twelve months of trading.

In 1971, HSA secured Australia's biggest mandate at the time, a US$60 million financing for corrugated iron manufacturer John Lysaght Australia. HSA expanded its presence in the Australian market, opening a Melbourne office in 1972, and a Brisbane office in 1975.

In other business initiatives during the decade, HSA helped pioneer the foreign currency hedge market in Australia, commenced gold bullion trading, extended its coverage to all listed commodities and was one of the first merchant banks to be granted floor member status at the Sydney Futures Exchange.

1980–1989 
The 1980s were marked by significant financial market deregulation in Australia, including the floating of the Australian dollar and the removal of restrictions on foreign banks. To take advantage of the opportunities offered by deregulation, HSA submitted a proposal for the formation of a new substantially Australian owned and controlled bank to be called Macquarie Bank Limited. Authority for HSA to become Macquarie Bank Limited (MBL) was received from the Federal Treasurer Paul Keating on 28 February 1985, making it only the second private trading bank to be established in Australia in modern times.

The bank continued to grow its activities in the 1980s. It became Australia's leading bullion trader, initiated 24-hour foreign exchange trading, commenced stockbroking and corporate leasing activities, opened offices in London and Munich, expanded into funds management by establishing Australia's first cash management account and formed a new structured finance business which would grow to become one of the largest in the world. It also implemented the risk management framework which is credited for the organisation's long history of unbroken profitability. The framework ensured Macquarie was not materially exposed to the October 1987 global share market crash.

In other initiatives, Macquarie established its philanthropic arm, the Macquarie Group Foundation, which has since contributed more than $A330 million to community organisations around the world, and established what has become one of Australia's largest corporate art collections, the Macquarie Group Collection.

1990–1999 
On 29 July 1996, Macquarie Bank Limited listed on the Australian Securities Exchange (ASX:MQG). By 30 October 1996 Macquarie had entered the ASX All Ordinaries Index, with a market capitalisation of approximately A$1.3 billion and would grow to more than A$35 billion in 2018 to become one of Australia's largest listed companies.

Macquarie continued its overseas expansion during the early 1990s, opening offices in New York, Hong Kong, Singapore and Beijing, while extending its Australian operations to Perth and the Gold Coast. Acquisitions during the decade included Boston Australia Limited, Security Pacific Australia and the investment banking arm of Bankers Trust Australia.

In 1994, Macquarie began its infrastructure investment business with the underwriting and placement of publicly listed equity for the Hills Motorway in Sydney. It has continued to grow these activities to become the world's leading infrastructure manager. During the decade, Macquarie also launched its private banking and residential mortgages businesses and established a number of real estate and investment trusts.

2000–2009 
Macquarie continued to expand its Asia operations in the early 2000s with the opening of offices in Seoul and Tokyo in 2000, and through the acquisition of ING Group's Asian cash equities business in March 2004.

The decade was also marked by the global expansion of Macquarie's infrastructure business, with infrastructure investment funds established in Korea, China, Europe, Russia, India and the Middle East. On 16 December 2004, Macquarie Infrastructure Corporation began trading as Macquarie Infrastructure Company Trust on the New York Stock Exchange (NYSE:MIC).

Macquarie made a number of significant acquisitions, particularly in the US, in the later part of the 2000s. These included US energy marketing and trading company Cook Inlet Energy Supply, establishing Macquarie's physical natural gas trading business in the US, and Constellation Energy's Houston-based downstream natural gas trading operations. As at 2018 Macquarie Group is the second largest physical gas trader in North America.

Other acquisitions included UK gas supply company Corona Energy in August 2006 and, in 2009, independent energy advisory firm Tristone Global Capital Inc; specialist investment bank Fox-Pitt Kelton Cochran Caronia Walker; Canadian wealth management business Blackmont Capital Inc; the wholesale electricity trading business of US firm Integrys Energy; US-based fixed income fund manager Allegiance Investment Management; the equity derivatives and structured products business of German private bank Sal. Oppenheim; and Condor Ferries service between the UK, Channel Islands and France.

In 2005, Macquarie announced an unsolicited takeover bid for the London Stock Exchange valuing the company at £1.5 billion, a bid rejected by LSE management.

In 2007, MBL securityholders and the Federal Court approved the restructure of the Macquarie Group into a non-operating holding company (NOHC) structure.

2010–present 

In 2010, Macquarie Group completed its then largest acquisition with the purchase of Delaware Investments, a leading US-based diversified asset management firm, from Lincoln Financial Group. As a result of the acquisition, Macquarie became one of the world's top 50 asset managers. The same year, the company, through its subsidiary Macquarie Equipment Rentals, was criticised by the Australian Competition & Consumer Commission for suing 300 small businesses caught up in misleading telephony bundling deals.

In March 2015, Macquarie announced the acquisition of a $US4 billion aircraft operating lease portfolio from AWAS Aviation Capital, bringing Macquarie's portfolio up to more than 220 aeroplanes. In October Macquarie entered into an agreement to acquire the A$8.2 billion Esanda dealer finance portfolio from ANZ Banking Group.

In 2017 A Macquarie-led consortium acquired the UK Green Investment Bank plc from HM Government and rebranded as the Green Investment Group (GIG).

In June 2017, Macquarie's Commodities and Global Markets business completed its acquisition of Cargill's petroleum business as well as its North America power and gas business. The transaction expanded Macquarie's global financial and physical oil business footprint to include Geneva and Minneapolis. Also that year, Macquarie, via a deal in which it acquired Thames Water, a  private utility company responsible for public water supply and waste water treatment in the London region of the UK, was found to have transferred to Thames Water £2bn of debt before selling its stake in the company. These disclosures followed scrutiny of the possible financial causes of Thames Water's extensive pollution of the Thames, and other rivers, with untreated sewage between 2012 and 2014, for which Thames Water was fined a record £20m. In response to criticism, Macquarie noted that during its tenure Thames Water invested more than £11 billion, or around £1 billion per year, more than twice that invested during the five-year period before privatisation in 1989. The Lee Tunnel was commissioned in January 2010 and opened by Mayor of London Boris Johnson, in January 2016. The capital investment undertaken to London's water supply was the first major investment since the Victorian era.

In September 2021, Cincinnati Bell, which also owns Hawaiian Tel since their July 2018 merger, was fully acquired by Macquaire Infrastructure Partners V.

In 2021, the company announced the purchase of Kansas City-based asset management company Waddell & Reed for $1.7 billion.

Also in 2021, Macquarie entered into a binding agreement to acquire AMP Capital's Global Equity and Fixed Income (GEFI) business in Australia.

In March 2022, Macquarie Asset Management completed its acquisition of Central Park Group, an independent investment advisory company specialising in alternative investment strategies for high-net-worth investors.

Current operations
Macquarie employs more than 17,000 staff in 33 countries. Macquarie's business activities are organised into four principal operating groups.

There are two annuity-style businesses:

 Macquarie Asset Management (MAM) – The world's biggest infrastructure asset manager and a top 50 global asset manager, managing more than $A735.5 billion of assets on behalf of investors across multiple asset classes.
 Banking and Financial Services (BFS) – Comprises Macquarie's retail banking operations and provides personal banking, wealth management and business banking products and services to approximately 1.7 million clients.

There are two markets facing businesses:

 Commodities and Global Markets (CGM) – A global business offering capital and financing, risk management, market access, physical execution and logistics solutions to its diverse client base.

 Macquarie Capital (MacCap) – Advises companies on growth opportunities, sources investment funds, negotiates transactions and lists companies on the share market, as well as investing alongside clients.

In addition to the principal operating groups, Macquarie has a network of support groups comprising: Corporate Operations Group (COG), Financial Management Group (FMG), Legal and Governance Group (LGG) and Risk Management Group (RMG).

Macquarie's Managing Director and CEO is Shemara Wikramanayake, who replaced Nicholas Moore in December 2018.

In the financial year ending 31 March 2021, Macquarie reported a record net profit A$3.015 billion and a final dividend per ordinary share of A$4.70 per share.

Macquarie holds a number of licences enabling it to conduct activities in the jurisdictions in which it operates and is regulated by a significant number of regulators globally. In Australia, Macquarie Bank Limited holds a banking licence and as an authorised deposit-taking institution (ADI), is supervised by the Australian Prudential Regulation Authority (APRA).  Other key Australian regulators include the Australian Securities & Investments Commission (ASIC) and AUSTRAC.  Globally, key regulators include the UK FCA and PRA; US CFTC, FINRA, NFA, FERC, SEC and Federal Reserve Board; IIROC; MAS; Hong Kong SFC; HKMA; SEBI; Japan FSA; Korean FSS; and New Zealand FMA.

Board of directors
Macquarie Group's current Board of Directors includes:
 Glenn R Stevens AC - Independent Chairman, Independent Voting Director, a director of the Anika Foundation and the Lowy Institute and former Governor of the Reserve Bank of Australia.
 Shemara Wikramanayake - Managing Director, Chief Executive Officer and Executive Voting Director.
 Jillian Broadbent AO - Independent Voting Director; Chair of the Board of Swiss Re Life and Health Australia, Chancellor of the University of Wollongong and a director of Woolworths Group Limited, the National Portrait Gallery of Australia and the Sydney Dance Company.
 Phillip Coffey - Independent Voting Director; Non-Executive Director of Lendlease Corporation Limited, a member of the Clean Energy Finance Corporation Board and Chairman of the Westpac Bicentennial Foundation.
 Michael J Coleman - Independent Voting Director; Adjunct Professor at the Australian School of Business at the University of New South Wales, Chairman of Planet Ark Environmental Foundation and former Senior Audit Partner with KPMG.
 Diane J Grady AM - Independent Voting Director; a member of the McKinsey Advisory Council and a Director of Spotless Group Holdings Limited and Tennis Australia.
 Rebecca J McGrath - Independent Voting Director, Chairman of Oz Minerals Limited and Scania Australia Pty Limited, Non-Executive Director of Goodman Group, Investa Office Management Holdings Pty Limited and Investa Wholesale Funds Management Limited. 
 Mike Roche - Independent Voting Director, member of the ADARA Partners Corporate Advisory Wise Counsel Panel, a small business mentor for Many Rivers Microfinance Limited and co-founder and director of the Sally Foundation.  
 Michael J Hawker - Independent Voting Director; a Director of Aviva Plc Group, Lead Independent Director of Washington H. Soul Pattinson and Company Limited and former CEO of Insurance Australia Group.
 Nicola M Wakefield-Evans - Independent Voting Director; a Director of Lend Lease Corporation Limited, Toll Holdings Limited and BUPA Australia and New Zealand Group.

Notable former employees

Business
 Christopher Castleman - General Manager, Hill Samuel Australia (1970-1971)
 David Clarke - Joint Managing Director, Hill Samuel Australia (1971-1977), Managing Director Hill Samuel Australia (1977-1984), founding Chairman of Macquarie Bank Limited (1984-2011)
 Mark Johnson - Joint Managing Director, Hill Samuel Australia (1971-1977), Director and/or Deputy Chairman Macquarie Bank Limited (1987-2007)
 Tony Berg - Managing Director and Chief Executive Officer (1984-1993)
 Bill Moss AO - Chief Executive Officer - Banking and Property (1991-2008)
 Allan Moss - Managing Director and Chief Executive Officer (1993-2008)
 Richard Sheppard - Deputy Managing Director (1996-2011)
 Nicholas Moore - Managing Director and Chief Executive Officer (2008-2018)

Philanthropy 
Macquarie's philanthropic arm, the Macquarie Group Foundation, has contributed more than A$475 million globally since 1985 with its community investment strategy. Recipients include the Clontarf Foundation and The Centre for Social Impact.

The firm's collection of artworks, the Macquarie Group Collection, established in 1987 to support emerging artists and displayed in more than 40 Macquarie offices worldwide, is one of world's largest corporate collections of Australian art comprising more than 850 individual works.

See also 

 Australian real estate investment trust
 Banking in Australia
 Better Place
 List of banks
 List of banks in Australia
 List of banks in Oceania
 Macquarie Power & Infrastructure Income Fund
 Kemble Water Holdings Limited
 Macquarie Airports
 Southern Cross Media Group

References

External links
 
 Macquarie Infrastructure and Real Assets (MIRA)
 

Banks of Australia
Companies listed on the Australian Securities Exchange
Investment banks
Financial services companies based in Sydney
Banks established in 1969
Financial services companies established in 1969
Australian brands
Martin Place
Australian companies established in 1969
1996 initial public offerings